is a Prefectural Natural Park in Tokyo, Japan. Across the border in Saitama Prefecture is the Sayama Prefectural Natural Park (Saitama).

See also
 National Parks of Japan
 Parks and gardens in Tokyo

References

Parks and gardens in Tokyo
Protected areas established in 1951
1951 establishments in Japan